Ananta Narayan Singh Deo (5 September 1929 – 1 December 2003) was an Indian ruler and politician who served as Member of 9th Lok Sabha from Aska Lok Sabha constituency, 13th Leader of Opposition in Odisha Legislative Assembly from Surada Assembly constituency, Deputy Minister for Industries, Commerce, Community Development and Panchayat Raj in Cabinet of Odisha and Raja of Dharakote Estate.

Personal life 
He was born in 5 September 1929 and died in 1 December 2003. He was educated in Stewart School, Cuttack and passed Senior Cambridge from The Doon School and was graduated from St. Stephen's College, Delhi in 1951. He married Shanti Devi in April 1960. His son is Kishore Chandra Singh Deo and daughter in law is Nandini Devi.

Career 
In 13 February 1980, he replaced Prahallad Mallick as Leader of the Opposition. He was the runner up for 2000 Odisha Legislative Assembly election and 1980 Odisha Legislative Assembly election from Patnagarh Assembly constituency.

References 

Living people
India MPs 1989–1991
Leaders of the Opposition in Odisha
Odisha MLAs 1980–1985
1929 births